Abraham Morris Lilienfeld (November 13, 1920 – August 6, 1984) was an American epidemiologist and professor at the Johns Hopkins School of Hygiene and Public Health. He is known for his work in expanding epidemiology to focus on chronic diseases as well as infectious ones.

Early life and education
Lilienfeld was born in New York City on November 13, 1920. His father, Joe Lilienfeld, came from a wealthy family in Galicia, Ukraine, and worked as a Galician rabbinical scholar. Joe and his wife had immigrated to the United States in 1914 to escape the draft, leaving their money (which was all in German marks) behind in Germany when they did so. He graduated from Erasmus High School, whereupon he enrolled at Johns Hopkins University in Baltimore, allowing him to move in with his brother, Sam (a Baltimore resident), in 1938. In 1941, he received his A.B. from Johns Hopkins, after which he applied to the Johns Hopkins School of Medicine, but was told he would be rejected because he was Jewish. He then enrolled at Albany Medical College for a time before transferring to the University of Maryland's medical school. He received his M.D. from the University of Maryland in 1944, and his M.P.H. from the Johns Hopkins University School of Hygiene and Public Health in 1949.

Career
Lilienfeld joined the faculty of the Johns Hopkins University School of Hygiene and Public Health as a lecturer in 1950, and became an assistant professor of epidemiology there in 1952. From 1954 to 1958, he served on the faculty of the University of Buffalo School of Medicine. During this time, he also founded, and served as the first chairman of the department of statistics and epidemiological research at Roswell Park Comprehensive Cancer Center, then known as Roswell Park Memorial Institute. In 1958, he returned to Johns Hopkins, where he became the head of the Division of Chronic Diseases in the Department of Public Health Administration, which became the Department of Chronic Diseases in 1961. In 1964, he was named the staff director of the President's Commission on Heart Disease, Cancer, and Stroke. In 1967, he co-founded the Society for Epidemiologic Research, a learned society for epidemiologists. In 1970, his Department of Chronic Diseases merged with the Department of Epidemiology, and he became chair of the new department.  Department of Epidemiology there. In 1974, he sustained a cardiac arrest in the middle of a class he was teaching. He was revived by his students. Following on that illness, in 1975, he resigned the chair of this department. He subsequently became the first director the Masters in Public Health Program at Johns Hopkins, and instituted its reformation and revitalization. He then became the acting chair of the Department of Mental Hygiene for a 18 or so months during which a new chair was recruited. The last administrative role he had in his career was as acting chair of the Department of Behavioral Science. He has been described as "instrumental" in the founding of the American College of Epidemiology in 1979.

Work
Lilienfeld is known for working to expand the field of epidemiology from its original focus on infectious diseases to include chronic diseases, which has led to him being called the "father of contemporary chronic disease epidemiology." He is also known for, along with Richard Bordow, co-authoring the chapter "Biomedical Evidence for Determining Causality" in the Surgeon General's 1982 report Health Consequences of Smoking: Cancer, as well as for advocating for the link between smoking and lung cancer in a 1962 article he wrote for The Nation. In 1976, he and his colleagues began a study investigating the health effects of exposure to microwaves among people in the American embassy in Moscow, USSR.

Death
Lilienfeld died on August 6, 1984, of a heart attack in a Baltimore train station, at the age of 63.

Recognition
In 1970 he was elected as a Fellow of the American Statistical Association.

The American College of Epidemiology's most prestigious award, the "Abraham Lilienfeld Award", has been awarded annually since 1985. The Society for Epidemiologic Research gives the "Lilienfeld Postdoctoral Prize Paper" in honor of Dr. Lilienfeld.

References

External links
Abraham Lilienfeld on Johns Hopkins' Heroes of Public Health List

American public health doctors
1920 births
1984 deaths
Johns Hopkins University faculty
Scientists from New York City
University of Maryland, Baltimore alumni
Members of the National Academy of Medicine
Johns Hopkins University alumni
Jewish American scientists
Fellows of the American Statistical Association
Mathematicians from New York (state)
Members of the American Epidemiological Society
20th-century American Jews
20th-century American physicians
Physician-scientists